Indonesian faunal emblems are Indonesian endemic fauna that gain the status as national animal symbol that represent Indonesia and describe Indonesian biodiversity. Today there are three animals that gained the status as Indonesian faunal emblems: Komodo dragon, Javan hawk-eagle and  Asian arowana. Next to national animal symbols, there are also more specific provincial faunal emblems that represent each respective provinces of Indonesia.

Indonesian national faunal emblems
Komodo is an Indonesian endemic animal found only in Komodo, Padar and Rinca island within Komodo National Park. The surviving largest lizard on earth is easily recognised as Indonesian national animal. Komodo also become the emblem of East Nusa Tenggara province.

Elang Jawa or Javan hawk-eagle (Nisaetus bartelsi) an endangered raptor endemic to the mountainous forest regions of Java. The Javan hawk-eagle was chosen because its resemblance to the Garuda Pancasila, the most obvious physical traits is the prominent crest crowning its head and the plumage coloured dark-brownish to chestnut-gold. By Presidential decree, the Javan hawk-eagle was legally registered as considered as the national bird of Indonesia, and thus attributing the endangered species very high protection.

Both arwana merah (super red Asian arowana) and arwana emas (golden Asian arowana) are designated as Indonesian national animal of charm and also national fish. These fish are endemic to rivers of Sumatra and Indonesian Borneo. Both species of Scleropages aureus (red-tailed golden arowana) is native to northern Sumatra, while the Scleropages legendrei (super red arowana) is native to Kapuas river and nearby lakes in West Kalimantan.

Indonesian provincial faunal emblems
Each of 34 Provinces of Indonesia have their own faunal emblems that represents their provinces. The faunal emblems are:

Meanwhile, Helmeted friarbird (Philemon buceroides) was designated as faunal emblem of ex-province Timor Timur (1976-1999).

See also
 List of Indonesian floral emblems

References 

Lists of animals
Emblems
Faunal Emblems
National symbols of Indonesia
National emblems